Paul Richardson may refer to:

 Paul Richardson Sr. (born 1969), American football player
 Paul Richardson (American football) (born 1992), American football player, and son of the above
 Paul Richardson (organist) (1932–2006), home field organist for the Philadelphia Phillies, 1970–2005
 Paul Richardson (priest) (born 1947), British Roman Catholic priest and former Anglican bishop
 Paul Richardson (footballer) (born 1949), English football player
 Paul Richardson (recorder maker) (born 1947), musical instrument maker
 Paul Richardson (businessman)